Vyaamoham is a 1978 Indian Malayalam-language film,  directed by K. G. George. The film stars Adoor Bhasi, Lakshmi, Mohan Sharma and Janardanan in the lead roles. The film has musical score by Ilaiyaraaja. It is a remake of the Tamil film Policekaran Magal, itself based on a play.

Cast 
Adoor Bhasi
Lakshmi
Mohan Sharma
Janardanan

Soundtrack 
The music was composed by Ilaiyaraaja and the lyrics were written by Dr Pavithran.

References

External links 
 

1978 films
1970s Malayalam-language films
Films scored by Ilaiyaraaja
Malayalam remakes of Tamil films
Films directed by K. G. George
Indian films based on plays